The 1895–96 Scottish Cup was the 23rd season of Scotland's most prestigious football knockout competition. The Cup was won by Heart of Midlothian when they beat Hibernian 3-1 in the final.

Calendar

First round

 Match Declared Void

First round replay

Second round

Quarter-final

Quarter-final replay

Semi-finals

Final

See also
 1895–96 in Scottish football

References

RSSF Scottish Cup 95-96

1895-1896
Cup
Cup